Maurice Greene (12 August 1696 – 1 December 1755) was an English composer and organist.

Biography 
Born in London, the son of a clergyman, Greene became a choirboy at St Paul's Cathedral under Jeremiah Clarke and Charles King. He studied the organ under Richard Brind, and after Brind died, Greene became organist at St Paul's.

With the death of William Croft in 1727, Greene became organist at the Chapel Royal, and in 1730 he became Professor of Music at Cambridge University. In 1735 he was appointed Master of the King's Musick. At his death, Greene was working on the compilation Cathedral Music, which his student and successor as Master of the King's Musick, William Boyce, was to complete. Many items from that collection are still used in Anglican services today.

He wrote very competent music in the style prevalent in Georgian England, particularly longer Verse Anthems. His acknowledged masterpiece, Lord, let me know mine end, is a representative example. Greene sets a text full of pathos using a polyphonic texture over a continuous instrumental walking bass, with a particularly effective treble duet in the middle of the work. Both this section and the end of the anthem contain superb examples of the Neapolitan sixth chord.  His organ voluntaries - published only some years after his death - are closer to Thomas Roseingrave in style than, say, John Stanley or William Boyce, and are more contrapuntal than melodic.  They display a more reflective and profound character, and do not specify manuals or stops as do later contemporaries. Instances of 'false relation' can be heard frequently in these works.  

He died in 1755 aged 59 and was initially buried at St Olave Old Jewry.  On the church's demolition in 1887, he was reburied in St Paul's Cathedral.

Works
Greene wrote a good deal of both sacred and secular vocal music, including:
 the anthem Hearken Unto Me, Ye Holy Children (1728)
 the oratorio The Song of Deborah and Barak (1732)
 the oratorio Jephtha (1737)
 the opera Florimel (1734)
 settings of sonnets from Edmund Spenser's Amoretti (1739)
 a collection of anthems (1743), of which the best-known is Lord, let me know mine end.
 the opera Phoebe (completed 1747)

He also published keyboard music, including:
Choice Lessons, for harpsichord or spinet (London, 1733)
6 Overtures … in Seven Parts, arranged for harpsichord or spinet (London, 1745)
A Collection of Lessons, for harpsichord (London, 1750)
Twelve Voluntarys, for organ or harpsichord ((published posthumously by J. Bland of Holborn) London, 1779)

References 

 Johnstone, H. Diack. "Greene, Maurice", Grove Music Online ed. L. Macy (Accessed 4 October 2004).

External links

Free scores 

1696 births
1755 deaths
18th-century classical composers
18th-century English composers
18th-century keyboardists
18th-century British male musicians
Professors of Music (Cambridge)
British male organists
Cathedral organists
Classical composers of church music
English Baroque composers
English classical composers
English male classical composers
English opera composers
English classical organists
Male opera composers
Masters of the King's Music
Members of the Academy of Ancient Music
Musicians from London
People educated at St. Paul's Cathedral School
Male classical organists